Clear Marie Rivers is a fictional character from the Final Destination film series. Created by Jeffrey Reddick and portrayed by Ali Larter, the character first appeared in Final Destination (2000) as a high school senior who, after surviving a plane explosion foreseen by Alex Browning, assists him on "cheating Death" by rescuing the other survivors from their impending doom. Clear returns in the sequel Final Destination 2 (2003), where she aids Kimberly Corman in saving the new set of victims from the Route 23 pile-up. The character also appears in the novelizations of the two motion pictures.

Created by Reddick, Clear was further developed by James Wong and Glen Morgan to be "the loner of the group" and a girl who's insecure about her sex appeal and tries to hide it with a gothic appearance. Larter described her as someone who's suffered from many losses in her life, causing her to close off from other people. Clear's death occurs in the second installment of the franchise, where she was fatally incinerated in an oxygenated explosion.

Along with Tony Todd, Larter is the only actor to reprise their role in the series. The character of Clear has polarized critics, particularly for her characterization, which has earned mixed reviews. However, Larter's portrayal of the character was praised, winning a Young Hollywood Award and earning a nomination for a Blockbuster Entertainment Award.

Appearances

Film

Final Destination
Clear Rivers is introduced in the 2000 film Final Destination as one of the seniors from the fictional Mt. Abraham High School boarding Volée Airlines Flight 180 heading to Paris on May 13, 2000. On board, Alex Browning warns the passengers about his vision of the airliner exploding in mid-air, gaining no support from anyone, except for Clear. She, along with Alex and their classmates Tod Waggner, Terry Chaney, Carter Horton, Billy Hitchcock, and teacher Ms. Valerie Lewton are removed from the plane before it explodes in mid-air minutes after take-off, killing the other 286 passengers and crew. Thirty-nine days later, while at the memorial for the victims, she presents Alex a white rose as gratitude for saving her life.

After Tod dies in a freak accident, they go to the morgue to see his body and find mortician William Bludworth. Bludworth explains to them Death's design and warns them that they're still in danger. Realizing this, they attempt to save the remaining survivors. Following Terry's and Ms. Lewton's deaths, they are successful in saving Carter's life. Unfortunately, only seconds later Billy dies, causing them to realize that if they intervene in someone's death they can save that person. Believing himself to be next, Alex withdraws from the group.

After Alex realizes that Clear is actually next to die he goes to her house to save her. Due to her house experiencing short circuits, she attempts to escape with her car. Despite the car being trapped by livewires, Alex manages to save her and they both survive the ordeal. Months later in Paris, Alex has doubts about their triumph over Death. Noticing signs of impending doom Clear saves Alex from a speeding bus, but they both witness Carter's demise by a falling sign.

Alternate ending
In the alternate ending of the film, Alex and Clear have sex while lurking at a beach, resulting in her pregnancy. Later on, Alex dies after the livewire sets him on fire while saving her. Nine months later, she gives birth to their son, naming him Alexander Chance, and reunites with Carter, safe in the knowledge that they defeated Death.

Final Destination 2
Clear returns in the sequel Final Destination 2 (2003), set a year after the events of Final Destination. After Evan Lewis' death, Kimberly Corman visits Clear inside Stonybrook Mental Institution and asks for her help concerning the safety of the Route 23 pile-up survivors: Officer Thomas Burke, Kat Jennings, Rory Peters, Eugene Dix, as well as Nora Carpenter and her son Tim. While she does inform Kimberly of what she knows about Death, she's still too distraught over Alex's death and tells Kimberly to let the other survivors perish and save only herself. Nevertheless, after Tim dies, she changes her mind and accompanies Kimberly and Burke to Bludworth, who informs them the equilibrium of Death and "new life", implying their salvation upon the unborn son of survivor Isabella Hudson. The three of them gather the remaining survivors to Burke's apartment but despite Clear's and Kat's attempts to save her, Nora gets decapitated by an elevator.

En route to Isabella, Clear and the others realize that all of them are still alive due to the Flight 180 survivors having gotten off the plane. While driving to the hospital, they are involved in a car accident that leaves Eugene needing medical help and eventually leads to the deaths of Kat and Rory. Following their deaths, Clear, Kimberly, and Burke go to the hospital to save Isabella. While they do succeed in finding her in time and ensuring her infant survives, Kimberly has another premonition that reveals to her Isabella was never meant to die in the pile-up, meaning they're still in danger. Understanding the situation, Clear tries to find Eugene's room. Finding him contained by an oxygenated room, she opens the door, subsequently loosening the plug of Eugene's defribrillator, creating a spark that incinerates Eugene's room, killing them both.

In her alternate death scene, Clear smiles in contentment as flames engulf her body. Clear's death is shown in x-ray format during the opening credits of The Final Destination, and briefly in the death montage of Final Destination 5.

The Final Destination
A reference is made to the character through an easter egg in The Final Destination, where Clear's name appears on a sign of a brand of water that reads "Clear Rivers Water". The sign triggers the main visionary and alerts him that water will be causing an upcoming fatal accident.

Literature
Clear Rivers made her literary debut in January 2006 when Natasha Rhodes released a novelization of the film entitled Final Destination. The book follows the events of the film, but expands on Clear's backstory regarding her parents. The last adaptation to feature Clear was Final Destination 2; it was released 28 days following its precursor. Likewise co-written by Rhodes and Nancy A. Collins, the novel follows the events of Final Destination 2, with the substitution of a birthday cake in conducting the combustion and the inclusion of a hospital orderly among the victims.

Development

Casting and creation
Along with other Final Destination characters, Clear was conceived by series creator Jeffrey Reddick. Ali Larter, who starred in the 1999 film Varsity Blues, was cast as Clear Rivers. Larter stated that she was thrilled to "be playing a more introverted, darker character than [she] was accustomed to at the time". She thought the script was special and turned down all other scripts where she would have been cast in roles such as a cheerleader or a victim. Larter liked the themes of both films and thought they were fascinating within their genre. According to her, the film shows how easy it is to turn on someone and to blame someone when you're scared and about trusting your intuitions and yourself.

On the subject of returning for the sequel, Larter was chosen by New Line Cinema over her co-star Devon Sawa, who played as Alex Browning in the first film. "We’ve brought back Clear in an interesting way and we just felt that to bring both of them back would make you wonder too much just what the hell they’d been doing for the past few months", producer Craig Perry conveyed on developing the cliffhanger of Final Destination. Perry said that bringing back Clear over Alex was due to narrative reasons, stating that there were no financial problems that prevented Sawa from returning. He also observed that Clear is more knowledgeable in terms of mentoring the new protagonist and that she was used as the main link to the original film. Larter was delighted when New Line reinstated her and found it "terrific" that she had some input into the script. As a result, Sawa's character was killed off-screen in Final Destination 2, as divulged by Clear to Kimberly during their first meeting.

Characterization
Larter defined Clear as a girl who's suffered numerous losses in her life, has fallen into herself, and has made a life within that. She broadened her description as an estranged artist who's holding to her grip for what the world has given her. In the original screenplay of James Wong and Glen Morgan, she is described as the loner in the group who wears dark colors to hide her sex appeal, something she's insecure about. Larter dyed her hair brunette for the majority of the film to suit Clear's gothic outlook. Despite this, Larter reverted to her original blonde hair colour for the film's ending.

Clear changed drastically in the sequel. Larter indicated that the character has gotten to a hardened place and has tucked herself inside because of the pain she experienced in her life. By having herself committed to a mental hospital, she has created a safehouse to avoid Death. In the draft screenplay of J. Mackye Gruber and Eric Bress, she is identified as while still beautiful, the young woman bears few traces of her former self. Her dark and haunted eyes dart around suspiciously, maddened by chronic
paranoia. Bordering on savage, her hair is patchy whereas her movements are fidgety, erratic, and distracted by something unseen.

Reception

Critical response
Clear in Final Destination has received mixed reviews from critics. Joe Leydon of Variety claimed that Larter never seems to be entirely at ease in her part, and finds her one-on-one conversation between Alex "annoyingly jagged" because of attempted editing salvage jobs. John Fallon of JoBlo.com remarked that Larter also holds her own as a strong yet vulnerable character by conveying her underlying sadness perfectly, asserting it as a "step up from the whip cream-bimbo she played in Varsity Blues." Dustin Putman of TheMovieBoy.com praised her as effective; whereas Brett Gallman of Oh, The Horror! commended Larter for upstaging Sawa's performance and carrying the film. Mick LaSalle of the San Francisco Chronicle noted Larter and Sawa's relationship as appealing as the film progresses.

Similarly, Clear also garnered mixed reviews in Final Destination 2. Robert Koehler of Variety said that Larter was cast little light; while Putman of TheMovieBoy.com admired that Larter accurately plays Clear as an emotionally worn-down young woman who may still be alive, but realizes that it is only a matter of time before fate has its way with her. Nevertheless, Putman found her performance short. David Grove of Film Threat stated that she spends the whole movie looking miserable with her frigid acting; and criticized her and A. J. Cook as "dumb blonde leads" as well. Despite this, Robin Clifford of Reeling Reviews was favorable to Larter's performance, saying she was giving the smart-ass edge her character needs. Gallman of Oh, The Horror! claimed that Larter is again the bright spot; whereas Andrew Manning of Radio Free Entertainment positively acknowledged her, declaring that Larter rules the film. Manning argued that while everyone else is merely a hastily assembled caricature without depth, Clear has a well-defined background and history with recognition to her appearance in the first film. He further affirmed that Final Destination fans will see Clear as the heroic franchise veteran.

Accolades
Larter's performance in Final Destination earned her the Young Hollywood Award for a Breakthrough Performance by a Female in 2001. She also obtained a nomination from Blockbuster Entertainment Awards for Favorite Actress in Horror (Internet Only) in the same year.

References

Fictional characters from New York (state)
Film characters introduced in 2000
Fictional characters with post-traumatic stress disorder
Fictional characters with precognition
Fictional hermits
Final Destination characters
Final girls
Teenage characters in film